Samuel Shaw (December 1768October 23, 1827) was an American politician. He served as a United States representative from Vermont.

Biography
Shaw was born in Dighton in the Province of Massachusetts Bay to John Shaw and Molly Hudson. He moved to Putney, Vermont at the age of ten, and received limited schooling as a youth. He moved to Castleton in the Vermont Republic in 1789 and studied medicine for two years, and then commenced the practice of medicine in Castleton.

Shaw was elected to both the Vermont House of Representatives in 1800. He served from 1800 until 1807, and was Presidential Elector from Vermont in 1804. He was elected as a Democratic-Republican candidate to the Tenth Congress to fill the vacancy caused by the resignation of James Witherell. He was reelected to the Eleventh and Twelfth Congresses and served from September 6, 1808, to March 3, 1813.

He served in the United States Army during the War of 1812 as a hospital surgeon from April 6, 1813, to June 15, 1815, when he was honorably discharged. He was reinstated on September 13, 1815; appointed post surgeon April 18, 1818, and resigned on December 31, 1818.

Shaw is not to be confused with the early whistleblower Samuel Shaw, who had been arrested by Esek Hopkins during the Revolutionary War.  Representative Shaw would have been nine at the time of the incident.

Family life
Shaw married Sally Campbell in 1788. Shaw's son Henry Shaw also served in the United States Congress as United States Representative from Massachusetts, serving from 1817 until 1821.

Death
Shaw died on October 23, 1827 in Clarendon Springs. He is interred at Castleton Congregational Cemetery in Castleton, Vermont.

References

External links 
 
 Biographical Directory of the United States Congress: SHAW, Samuel, (1768 - 1827)
 The Political Graveyard: Shaw, Samuel (1768–1827)
 govtrack.us: Rep. Samuel Shaw

1768 births
1827 deaths
Members of the Vermont House of Representatives
People from Dighton, Massachusetts
Democratic-Republican Party members of the United States House of Representatives from Vermont
People of colonial Massachusetts
United States Army personnel of the War of 1812
Burials in Vermont
People from Putney, Vermont
People from Castleton, Vermont